Chewing tobacco is a type of smokeless tobacco product that is placed between the cheek and lower gum to draw out its flavor. Some users chew it, others do not. It consists of coarsely chopped aged tobacco that is flavored and often sweetened; it is not ground fine like dipping tobacco. Unwanted juices are then spat.
 
Chewing tobacco may be left as loose leaf or compressed into a small rectangular "plug". Nearly all modern chewing tobaccos are produced by a process of leaf curing, cutting, fermentation, and processing, which may include sweetening and flavoring.  Historically, many American chewing-tobacco brands popular during the American Civil War era were made with cigar clippings.  Chewing tobacco is a source of nicotine.

History 

Chewing is one of the oldest methods of consuming tobacco. Indigenous peoples of the Americas in both North and South America chewed the leaves of the plant long before the arrival of Europeans.

The Southern United States was distinctive for their production of tobacco, which earned premium prices globally. Most farmers grew some for their own use, or traded with neighbors who grew it. Commercial sales became important in the late 19th century, as major tobacco companies arose in the South, becoming one of the largest employers in  Winston-Salem, North Carolina, Durham, North Carolina, and Richmond, Virginia. Southerners dominated the tobacco industry in the United States. So much so that a concern as large as the Helme Tobacco Company, headquartered in New Jersey, was headed by former Confederate officer George Washington Helme. In 1938, R.J. Reynolds marketed 84 brands of chewing tobacco, 12 brands of smoking tobacco, and the top-selling Camel brand of cigarettes. Reynolds sold large quantities of chewing tobacco, even though that market peaked around 1910.

A historian of the American South in the late 1860s reported on typical usage in the region where it was grown, paying close attention to class and gender:

Chewing tobacco is still used, predominantly by young males in some parts of the American Southeast, but also in other areas and age groups. In September 2006, both the Republican and Democratic candidates for Senator from Virginia admitted to chewing tobacco and agreed that it sets a bad example for children.

In the late 19th century, during the peak in popularity of chewing tobacco in the Western United States, a device known as the spittoon was a ubiquitous feature throughout places both private and public (e.g. parlors and passenger cars). The purpose of the spittoon was to provide a receptacle for excess juices and spittle accumulated from the oral use of tobacco. As chewing tobacco's popularity declined throughout the years, the spittoon became merely a relic of the Old West and is rarely seen outside museums. Spittoons are still present on the floor of the U.S. Senate's old chamber, honored as tradition.

Types

Chewing tobacco is sold in several different varieties.

Loose-leaf
Loose-leaf chewing tobacco is the most widely available and most frequently used type of chewing tobacco.  It consists of shredded tobacco leaf, usually sweetened and sometimes flavored, and often sold in a sealed pouch typically weighing 3 oz.  Loose-leaf chewing tobacco has a sticky texture due to the sweeteners added.  Common loose-leaf chewing tobacco brands include Red Man, Levi Garrett, Beech-Nut, and Stoker's.

Plug

Plug chewing tobacco is tobacco leaves pressed into a square, brick-like mass called a plug.  From this, pieces are bitten off or cut from the plug and then chewed.  Plug tobacco is declining in popularity, thus less readily available than loose-leaf chewing tobacco. Historically, plug tobacco could be either smoked in a pipe or chewed, but today, these are two distinct products.

Twist
Twist chewing tobacco consists of leaves twisted together into a rope-like mass.  Unlike most loose-leaf tobaccos, twist chewing tobacco is usually not sweetened.  Pieces of twist are either bitten off or cut, and then chewed. Twist chewing tobacco is not widely available and is mostly found in Appalachia.  Historically, twists could also be smoked in a pipe, or ground up into nasal snuff.

Health issues
Oral and spit tobacco increase the risk for leukoplakia, a precursor to oral cancer. Chewing tobacco has been known to cause cancer, particularly of the mouth and throat. According to International Agency for Research on Cancer, "Some health scientists have suggested that smokeless tobacco should be used in smoking cessation programs and have made implicit or explicit claims that its use would partly reduce the exposure of smokers to carcinogens and the risk for cancer. These claims, however, are not supported by the available evidence.

Chewing tobacco and baseball
When the rules of baseball were first written in 1845, the carcinogenic potential of chewing tobacco was unknown. At that time, it was commonly used by players and coaches alike. Smokeless tobacco use became rampant by players by the early 1900s. The use of chewing tobacco in baseball steadily increased until the mid-20th century, when cigarettes became popular and took the place of some players' smokeless tobacco habit. 

Joe Garagiola, who quit, warned about chewing tobacco: 

Bill Tuttle was a Major League player who made a big name for himself both through baseball and his anti-chewing tobacco efforts. Tuttle was an outfielder for the Detroit Tigers, Kansas City Athletics, and Minnesota Twins. He was an avid tobacco chewer; even his baseball cards pictured him with a bulge in his cheek from the tobacco. Nearly 40 years after he began using smokeless tobacco, Tuttle developed a tumor in his mouth so severe, it protruded through his skin. A few years before he died, Tuttle had many of his teeth, his jawbone, his gums, and his right cheekbone removed. He also had his taste buds removed. Tuttle dedicated the last years of his life to speaking with Major League teams about not using chewing tobacco where television cameras could see the players so that children could not witness and be influenced by it. He also dedicated time to the National Spit Tobacco Education Program, which was being run by friend and former Major League player, Joe Garagiola. Tuttle died July 27, 1998, after a 5-year battle with cancer.

Hall of Fame outfielder Tony Gwynn died of salivary cancer on June 16, 2014. He claimed the cancer was linked to his lifetime use of chewing and dipping tobacco.

A 2016 MLB collective bargaining agreement prohibited all new Major League Baseball players from using smokeless tobacco.

Effect on youth 
Debate exists over whether players should be banned from using tobacco products during the games. The Major League Baseball Players Association disagrees, claiming it is a legal substance, so is acceptable to be used during games. Harvard School of Public Health professor Gregory Connolly, however, says, "the use of smokeless tobacco by players has a powerful role-model effect on youth, particularly among young males in sport, some of whom remain addicted in future careers as professional athletes." According to Connolly, one-quarter of Minor League players do not support allowing the use of chewing tobacco during games, and one-third of Major League players support abolishing it. Due to health concerns, the MLB was asked to ban the use of chewing tobacco during the 2011 World Series between the St. Louis Cardinals and Texas Rangers.

Statistics 
Many believe that the widespread use of chewing tobacco by baseball players has led to a rampant increase in youth, and particularly teen, use. Additionally, teen use of smokeless tobacco has increased, while use of all tobacco products by teens has decreased. This is true especially among white and Hispanic males. In 1970, five times as many 65-and-older males used smokeless tobacco as 18- to 24-year-olds did (12.7% of the population were 65+ male users, 2.2% of the population were 18–24 male users). More specifically, moist snuff use increased for males ages 18–24 from 1% of the population to 6.2% of the population, while 65+ male users decreased from 4% to 2.2%.

A 2009 survey by The U.S. Centers for Disease Control revealed that 8.9% of U.S. high-school students had used smokeless tobacco on at least 1 day during the 30 days before the survey. Usage was more common among males (15.0%) than females (2.2%) and among Whites (11.9%) than Blacks (3.3%) or Hispanics (5.1%). The five states with the highest percentage of high-school users were Wyoming (16.2%), North Dakota (15.3%), South Dakota (14.6%), Montana (14.6%), and West Virginia (14.4%).

Brands
Notable chewing tobacco brands include:

 Beech-Nut
 Copenhagen
 Grizzly
 Kodiak
 Levi Garrett
 Mail Pouch
 Oliver Twist
 Red Man
 Skoal
 Stoker's

See also
 Gutka
 Herbal smokeless tobacco
 Smokeless tobacco
 Naswar
Betel chewing
 Big League Chew

References

Tobacco products
Habits
Masticatories
Western (genre) staples and terminology